The Best of Ronnie Dove is a 1966 compilation album by American pop artist Ronnie Dove.

History

After just three album releases, Diamond Records compiled and released the album. It featured his then-current single When Liking Turns to Loving as the closing track.  The song would peak at #6 on the Billboard Easy Listening Chart and #18 on the Top 40 chart.  The other tracks were all released on his previous albums.

Release
The album peaked at number 35 on the Billboard Top LPs chart and was awarded a gold disk in 1969 for sales of over one million copies.
The original 1966 issue was released in both mono and stereo.  Both versions were available via Columbia Records Club.  The stereo version of the album was reissued digitally in 2021 by Ronnie Dove Music.

Chart performance

Track listing

References

1966 compilation albums
Ronnie Dove albums